Salvador Rodrígez was a Spanish politician who served as the fifty-first and sixty-first mayor of San Antonio, Texas in 1785 and 1796,  replacing to mayors Francisco Javier Rodríguez and Ramón de las Fuentes respectively.

References 

Mayors of San Antonio
People of Spanish Texas